Cutting Room Floor is a compilation album by British progressive rock band Kino, consisting of live recordings, demos and a previously unreleased cover song. It was released to coincide with their tour of Europe in December 2005.

Track listing
All songs by Kino except 9 by Kevin Gilbert
 "People (Live)" – 7:03
 "Throw It Away (Demo)" – 4:35
 "Perfect Tense (Live)" – 4:24
 "All You See (Demo)" – 5:13
 "Room For Two (Live)" – 3:52
 "Won't Fall Down (Demo)" – 2:44
 "Picture (Live)" – 3:10
 "Say You Will (Demo)" – 14:39
 "Parade (Cover)" – 9:49

Credits
 John Mitchell – guitars, lead vocals (all but 6)
 John Beck – synthesizers, backing vocals
 Pete Trewavas – bass, backing and lead (6) vocals, bass pedals
 Chris Maitland, drums, backing vocals, percussion
 Bob Dalton – drums, backing vocals

References

External links
 InsideOut.de – InsideOut Records (UK)

Kino (British band) albums
2005 compilation albums